This is a list of Members of Parliament (MPs) elected to the House of Commons of the United Kingdom by Welsh constituencies for the Forty-Seventh Parliament of the United Kingdom (1974 - 1979).

All MPs elected for Welsh constituencies at the October 1974 general election, held on 10 October 1974, served a full term and there were no by-elections.

The list is sorted by the name of the MP.

Political composition

MPs

By-elections
There were no by-elections during this period.

See also
 October 1974 United Kingdom general election

References

Wales
1974-79
MPs